The 2008 Women's Olympic Water Polo Qualifying Tournament was a tournament to decide the remaining four competing teams at the 2008 Summer Olympics in Beijing, PR China. Four teams were already qualified: Australia, China (host country), the Netherlands and the United States. The tournament was held at the new Olympic Swimming Pool (2005) in Imperia, Italy from February 17 to February 24, 2008 with twelve competing teams.

Teams

GROUP A

GROUP B

Preliminary round

Group A

February 17, 2008

February 18, 2008

February 19, 2008

February 20, 2008

February 21, 2008

Group B

February 17, 2008

February 18, 2008

February 19, 2008

February 20, 2008

February 21, 2008

Quarter finals
February 22, 2008

Semi finals
February 23, 2008

Finals
February 23, 2008 — 11th place

February 24, 2008 — 9th place

February 24, 2008 — 7th place

February 24, 2008 — 5th place

February 24, 2008 — 3rd place

February 24, 2008 — 1st place

Final ranking

Italy, Russia, Hungary and Greece qualified for the 2008 Summer Olympics in Beijing, PR China, joining Australia, PR China, Netherlands, and the United States.

Individual awards
Most Valuable Player

Best Goalkeeper

Best Scorer

See also
 2008 Men's Water Polo Olympic Qualifier

References
 Results
 Australian Water Polo

W
W
2008
Olymp